Charles Kemp (30 January 1864 – 3 December 1940) was an Australian cricketer. He played six first-class cricket matches between 1885 and 1898, four for South Australia and two for Victoria. He also played district cricket for South Melbourne.

See also
 List of Victoria first-class cricketers

References

External links
 

1864 births
1940 deaths
Australian cricketers
Victoria cricketers
Cricketers from Plymouth, Devon
South Australia cricketers
South Melbourne cricketers